Chaudhary Aftab Ahmed is an Indian politician and was first elected as an MLA in 2009 from Nuh (Mewat) constituency of Haryana. In 2019, he was re-elected and nominated as Deputy Leader of Congress Legislative Party Haryana. He has also served as Transport minister, Tourism minister, Printing & Stationery minister and state vice-president of the Haryana Congress.

Early life
Aftab Ahmed was born to Chaudhary Khurshid Ahmed and Firdos Begum. He has two brothers and one sister. His father was elected as MLA from Punjab in 1962, from Nuh constituency (Haryana) in 1968, from Taoru in 1977 and again from Nuh constituency in 1987 and 1996. His father served as minister thrice in Haryana and was later elected as Member of Parliament. His grandfather Chaudhary Kabir Ahmed was elected as MLA from Nuh Constituency in 1975 and from Taoru constituency in 1982.

Personal life
He married Memuna Sultan and has three children. He did B.Com. from GGDSD College Chandigarh, Punjab University and LLB from MDU, Rohtak.

Political career
He started his political career in 1991 from Taoru and in 2013 he was inducted into the cabinet as transport minister. He has served Indian National Congress at organizational level in different capacities and also as chief whip of the Congress Legislature Party.

Notable works
He started various projects in his constituency which has the third worst literacy rate among all tehsils in Haryana
 Set up medical college, polytechnic college and JBT training institute 
 Water management
 Regularisation of Haryana Roadways Transport Corporation (HRTC)

References

Indian National Congress politicians from Haryana
Living people
Members of the Haryana Legislative Assembly
20th-century Indian politicians
1966 births
Panjab University alumni
People from Faridabad district